The Selk'nam genocide was the genocide of the Selk'nam people, one of three indigenous tribes populating the Tierra del Fuego in South America, from the second half of the 19th to the early 20th century. The genocide spanned a period of between ten and fifteen years. The Selk'nam had an estimated population of 4,000 people around the 1880s but saw their numbers reduced to 500 by the early 1900s.

Background 

The Selk'nam are one of three indigenous tribes who inhabited the northeastern part of the archipelago, with a population before the genocide estimated at between 3,000 and 4,000. They were known as the Ona (people of the north), by the Yaghan (Yamana).

The Selk'nam had lived a semi-nomadic life of hunting and gathering in Isla Grande de Tierra del Fuego for thousands of years. The name of the island literally means "big island of Land of the Fire", which is the name the early Spanish explorers gave it as they saw the smoke from Selk'nam bonfires. They lived in the northeast, with the Haush people to their east on the Mitre Peninsula, and the Yaghan people to the west and south, in the central part of the main island and throughout the southern islands of the archipelago.

According to one study, the Selk'nam were divided into the following groups:
 Parika (located in the Northern Pampas).
 Herska (located in the southern forests)
 Chonkoyuka (located in the mountains in front of Inútil Bay), alongside the Haush.

History 
The last full-blooded Selk'nam, Ángela Loij, died in 1974. They were one of the last aboriginal groups in South America to be reached by Europeans. According to the 2010 United Nations Educational, Scientific and Cultural Organization (UNESCO) Atlas of the World's Languages in Danger, the Ona language, believed to be part of the Chonan family, is considered extinct, as the last speakers died in the 1980s.

About 4,000 Selk'nam were alive in the mid-nineteenth century; by 1930 this had been reduced to about 100. With the assimilation of many groups who later became Argentinians and Chileans, Selk'nam territory was conquered. The group's unique ceremonial costumes and body paint were frightening to many colonizers. This caused an unhealthy fear of their presence, and thereby offered a justification for their mass extermination.

The natives were plied with alcohol, deported, raped, and exterminated, with bounties paid to the most ruthless hunters. Martin Gusinde, who visited the island towards the end of 1918, recounted in his writings that the hunters sent the skulls of the murdered Selk'nam to foreign anthropological museums, which was done "in the name of science".

German anthropologist Robert Lehmann-Nitsche published the first scholarly studies of the Selk'nam, although he was later criticized for having studied members of the Selk'nam people who had been abducted and were exhibited in circuses in conditions of de facto slavery.

The gold rush 

The Chilean expedition of Ramón Serrano Montaner in 1879, was the one who reported the presence of important gold deposits in the sands of the main rivers of Tierra del Fuego. With this incentive, hundreds of foreign adventurers came to the island hoping to find long-awaited and distant lands, the initial support to produce auspicious fortunes. However, there was a rapid depletion of the metal.

Among hunters of the indigenous people were Julius Popper, Ramón Lista, Alexander McLennan, a "Mister Bond", Samuel Hyslop, John McRae, and Montt E. Wales.

The Beginning of the Selk'nam Extermination 
The ranching occupation became the center of controversy in the Magellanic colony. The colonial authorities were aware of the situation of the indigenous group, but their rulings sided with the ranchers' cause rather than the Selk'nam, who were excluded from their worldview based on "progress" and "civilization". Ranchers typically exercised their own judgement, including the finance of violent campaigns. Considerable numbers of foreign men were hired and quantities of arms were imported for these campaigns, with the goal of eliminating the Selk'nam, who were perceived as a major obstacle to the success of colonists' investments. Farm employees confirmed the routine nature of such campaigns.

Little is mentioned of the authors of said actions; these included many ranch owners, who were the direct superiors of the employees that participated in the ventures. These include Mauricio Braun, who acknowledged having financed some campaigns, justifying them as only intending to protect his investments (he was the boss of another known exterminator, Alexander A. Cameron). Another figure is the father-in-law of Mauricio Braun, José Menéndez Menéndez, one of the men who acted with the most severity against the Selk'nam in the Argentine territory of Tierra del Fuego. Known for being the owner of two cattle ranches that occupied more than 200,000 hectares in the center of Selk'nam territory, Menéndez was the boss of Alexander Mac Lennan. Mac Lennan or "Chanco Colorado", known widely as a murderer of indigenous people, participated in the massacre at Cabo Penas, where 17 indigenous people died. When he retired after 12 years of service, Menéndez gave Mac Lennan a valuable gold watch in recognition of his outstanding service.

The shareholders of the Company for the Exploitation of Tierra de Fuego (Sociedad Explotadora de Tierra de Fuego) strived to hide details from the public. This was not only a means for the company to avoid questioning but also a strategy to lower its controversial profile. Special attention was paid to these events after the intervention of the Salesian, who condemned the farmers' actions.

Beginning in the last decade of the 1890s, the situation of the Selk'nam became severe. As the territories of the north began to be largely occupied by farms, many indigenous people, besieged by hunger and persecuted by colonists, started to flee towards the extreme south of the island. This region was inhabited by groups who had a strong sense of ownership over the land. Consequently, the fights for control of territory intensified as livestock occupation became increased in the north of the island. The situation of the Selk'nam worsened with the establishment of once religious missions, which introduced illnesses to the vulnerable population.

Later conflicts between governor Manuel Señoret and the head of the Salesian mission José Fagnano did nothing more than make the condition of the Selk'nam more grave. Long disputes between civil authorities and priests did not allow a satisfactory solution to the indigenous issue to be reached. Governor Señoret favoured the rancher's cause, and took little interest in supervising the incidents that took place in Tierra del Fuego.

The Trial of the Genocide 
Years later, justice for the conflict was attempted through the indictment (1895–1904) by Judge Waldo Seguel. This process confirmed the factual nature of the hunting of indigenous people perpetrated in Tierra del Fuego. Indigenous people were captured and removed en masse, transferred to Punta Arenas, and distributed throughout the colony. It was judged that these acts were proposed by ranchers, but the civil authorities were complicit, regarding the genocide as a solution to the indigenous issue.

The judicial process, however, ruled that only a few farmworkers to be at fault, and these were released just a few months after the trial. The authors of the expeditions, such as owners and stakeholders of the farms Mauricio Braun, José Menéndez Menéndez, Rodolfo Stubenrauch, and Peter H. Mac Clelland, were never fairly prosecuted. Even official figures and civil servants, like governor Señoret and José Contardi, who theoretically had the greatest responsibility to guard the sanctity of the law, were never investigated. The book "Harassment Inflicted on the Indigenous People of Tierra de la Fuego" ("Vejámenes inferidos a los indígenas de Tierra del Fuego"), from author Carlos Vega Delgado, makes evident that Judge Waldo Seguel covered for ranchers who were guilty of genocide. The judge falsely recorded that he could not obtain a statement from the Selk'nam individuals who witnessed the genocide because there were no translators between the two languages. However, such translators did exist, such as various priests of the Salesian mission and sisters of María Auxiliadora who had learned the native dialect in the missions, as well as Spanish-speaking Selk'nams, like Tenenésk, Covadonga Ona, and even a deacon of the church.

Ranchers and farmers 
The large ranchers tried to drive out the Selk'nam, then began a campaign of extermination against them, with the complicity of the Argentine and Chilean governments. Large companies paid sheep farmers or militia a bounty for each Selk'nam dead, which was confirmed on presentation of a pair of hands or ears, or later a complete skull. They were given more for the death of a woman than a man. In addition, missionaries disrupted their livelihood through forcible relocation and inadvertently brought with them deadly epidemics.

Repression against the Selk'nam persisted into the early twentieth century. Chile moved most of the Selk'nam in their territory to Dawson Island in the mid-1890s, confining them to a Salesian mission. Argentina finally allowed Salesian missionaries to aid the Selk'nam and attempt to assimilate them, with their traditional culture and livelihoods then completely interrupted.

See also 
 Fuegians
 Ramón Lista
 Julius Popper
 Sociedad Explotadora de Tierra del Fuego
 Tierra del Fuego Gold Rush
 Selk'nam

References

Bibliography

Further reading 
 Luis Alberto Borrero, Los Selk'nam (Onas), Galerna, Buenos Aires 2007.
 Lucas Bridges, Uttermost Part of the Earth, London 1948.

External links 
 
 
 Genocide In Chile: A Monument Is Not Enough

Selk'nam people
19th century in Argentina
19th century in Chile
20th century in Argentina
20th century in Chile
Economic history of Argentina
Economic history of Chile
Genocide of indigenous peoples of South America
Genocides in South America
Human rights abuses in Argentina
Human rights abuses in Chile
Indigenous topics of the Southern Cone
Massacres in Argentina
Massacres in Chile
Political repression in Argentina
Political repression in Chile
History of Tierra del Fuego
Native American genocide
19th-century crimes in Argentina 
19th-century crimes in Chile 
19th-century murders in Argentina
19th-century murders in Chile